Gandhi Bilel Djuna born 6 May 1986, better known by his stage name Maître Gims and more recently just Gims (sometimes stylized as GIMS), is a DR Congolese singer and rapper. He grew up in France and currently lives in France and Morocco.

He is a former member of the hip hop group Sexion d'Assaut and released his first major album, Subliminal in 2013. The album sold over a million copies in France and peaked at number two in the Syndicat National de l'Édition Phonographique.

His other two albums follow: Mon cœur avait raison in 2015 and Ceinture noire in 2018 reached number one in France and Belgium (Wallonia) and peaked in the top 40 in various European countries, including Denmark, Italy and Switzerland.

Awards

NRJ Music Awards

MTV Europe Music Awards

Victoires de la Musique

W9 d'or de la musique

Distinctive International Arab Festivals Awards

References

Awards
Gims